Johan Pootjes (19 March 1882 – 30 October 1944) was a Dutch painter. His work was part of the painting event in the art competition at the 1936 Summer Olympics.

References

1882 births
1944 deaths
20th-century Dutch painters
Dutch male painters
Olympic competitors in art competitions
Painters from Amsterdam
20th-century Dutch male artists